The Alfonsine Tables, sometimes spelled Alphonsine Tables, provided data for computing the position of the Sun, Moon and planets relative to the fixed stars.

The tables were named after Alfonso X of Castile, who sponsored their creation. They were compiled in Toledo, Spain, and  contain astronomical data starting on June 1, 1252, the date of the coronation of the King.

Production

Alfonso X assembled a team of scholars, known as the Toledo School of Translators, who among other translating tasks, were asked to produce new tables that updated the Tables of Toledo. The new tables were based on earlier astronomical works and observations by Islamic astronomers, adding observations by astronomers Alfonso had gathered in Toledo, among them several Jewish scholars, like Yehuda ben Moshe and Isaac ibn Sid. He also brought Aben Raghel y Alquibicio and Aben Musio y Mohamat, from Seville, Joseph Aben Alí and Jacobo Abenvena, from Córdoba, and fifty more from Gascony and Paris.

The instructions for the Alfonsine tables were originally written in Castilian Spanish. The first printed edition of the Alfonsine tables appeared in 1483, and a second edition in 1492.

Georg Purbach used the Alfonsine tables for his book, Theoricae novae planetarum (New Theory of the Planets). Nicolaus Copernicus used the second edition in his work. One use of these and similar astronomical tables was to calculate ephemerides, which were in turn used by astrologers to cast horoscopes. Canons on the tables included those by John of Saxony and his teacher John of Lignères (fl 1320 to 1335).

Methodology
The methods of Claudius Ptolemy were used to compute the table, dividing the year into 365 days, 5 hours, 49 minutes, 16 seconds—very close to the currently accepted figure. Copernicus's observation that his system could explain the planetary motions with no more than 34 circles has been taken to imply that a large number of additional epicycles had been subsequently introduced into the Ptolemaic system in an attempt to make it conform with observation.  (There is a famous (but probably apocryphal) quote attributed to Alfonso upon hearing an explanation of the extremely complicated mathematics required to demonstrate  Ptolemy's geocentric model of the solar system: "If the Lord Almighty had consulted me before embarking on creation thus, I should have recommended something simpler.") However, modern computations using Ptolemy's unmodified theory have replicated the published Alfonsine tables.

Popularity
The Alfonsine tables were the most popular astronomical tables in Europe and updated versions were regularly produced for three hundred years. Nicolaus Copernicus, known as the father of modern astronomy, bought a copy while at the University of Cracow, and cared about it enough to have it professionally bound with pieces of wood and leather.  Alexander Bogdanov maintained that these tables formed the basis for Copernicus's development of a heliocentric understanding in astronomy. In 1551, the Prutenic Tables (or Prussian Tables) of Erasmus Reinhold's  were published. These tables used the Copernican heliocentric model of the solar system. Copernicus's publication, De revolutionibus, was not easy to use and the Prutenic tables were intended to make the heliocentric model more usable by astrologers and astronomers. However, the Prutenic tables were not widely adopted outside German speaking countries and new ephemerides based on the Alfonsine tables continued to be published until the publication of Johannes Kepler's Rudolphine Tables in 1627.

See also
 Literature of Alfonso X
 Toledan tables
 Zij
 Regiomontanus

References

External links
 Astronomical Tables 
 The full text of the book "Tabula astronomice Alfonsi Regis" published in 1492

13th-century books
Astronomical tables
Astrological texts
Medieval European astronomy
Alfonso X of Castile

ca:Taules de Toledo